Pharaoh's Revenge is a puzzle-platform game developed by Ivan Manley and released by Publishing International in 1988 for the Apple II, Commodore 64, and MS-DOS. The game is similar in style to Lode Runner (1983).

Gameplay
Pharaoh's Revenge is described by Dragon as an arcade action game.

Reception
The game was reviewed in 1989 in Dragon #142 by Hartley, Patricia, and Kirk Lesser in "The Role of Computers" column. The reviewers gave the game 3 out of 5 stars.

References

External links
Pharaoh's Revenge at IGN
Pharaoh's Revenge at GameFAQs

1988 video games
Apple II games
Commodore 64 games
DOS games
Puzzle-platform games
Video game clones
Video games based on Egyptian mythology
Video games developed in the United States
Video games set in Egypt